Venkatraman Ramakrishnan  (born 1952) is an Indian-born British and American structural biologist who shared the 2009 Nobel Prize in Chemistry with Thomas A. Steitz and Ada Yonath, "for studies of the structure and function of the ribosome".

Since 1999, he has worked as a group leader at the Medical Research Council (MRC) Laboratory of Molecular Biology (LMB) on the Cambridge Biomedical Campus, UK and is a Fellow of Trinity College, Cambridge. He served as  President of the Royal Society from 2015 to 2020.

Education and early life
Ramakrishnan was born in a Tamil family of Chidambaram in Cuddalore district of Tamil Nadu, India to C. V. Ramakrishnan and Rajalakshmi Ramakrishnan on 1 April 1952. Both his parents were scientists, and his father was head of the Department of Biochemistry at the Maharaja Sayajirao University of Baroda. At the time of his birth, Ramakrishnan's father was away from India doing postdoctoral research with David E. Green at the University of Wisconsin–Madison in the US.

His mother obtained a PhD in psychology from McGill University in 1959. completing it in only 18 months, and was mentored by Donald O. Hebb. Lalita Ramakrishnan, his younger sister, is professor of immunology and infectious diseases at the Department of Medicine, University of Cambridge, and is a member of the National Academy of Sciences.

Ramakrishnan moved to Vadodara (previously also known as Baroda) in Gujarat at the age of three, where he had his schooling at Convent of Jesus and Mary, except for spending 1960–61 in Adelaide, Australia. Following his pre-science at the Maharaja Sayajirao University of Baroda, he did his undergraduate studies in the same university on a National Science Talent Scholarship, graduating with a Bachelor of Science degree in physics in 1971. At the time, the physics course at Baroda was new, and based in part on the Berkeley Physics Course and The Feynman Lectures on Physics.

Immediately after graduation he moved to the US, where he obtained his Doctor of Philosophy degree in physics from Ohio University in 1976 for research into the ferroelectric phase transition of potassium dihydrogen phosphate (KDP) supervised by Tomoyasu Tanaka. Then he spent two years studying biology as a graduate student at the University of California, San Diego while making a transition from theoretical physics to biology.

Career and research
Ramakrishnan began work on ribosomes as a postdoctoral fellow with Peter Moore at Yale University. After his post-doctoral fellowship, he initially could not find a faculty position even though he had applied to about 50 universities in the United States.

He continued to work on ribosomes from 1983 to 1995 as a staff scientist at Brookhaven National Laboratory. 

In 1995, he  moved to the University of Utah as a Professor of Biochemistry, and in 1999, he moved to his current position at the Medical Research Council Laboratory of Molecular Biology in Cambridge, England, where he had also been a sabbatical visitor during 1991-92 on a Guggenheim Fellowship.

In 1999, Ramakrishnan's laboratory published a 5.5 angstrom resolution structure of the 30S subunit. The following year, his laboratory determined the complete molecular structure of the 30S subunit of the ribosome and its complexes with several antibiotics. This was followed by studies that provided structural insights into the mechanism that ensures the fidelity of protein biosynthesis. In 2007, his laboratory determined the atomic structure of the whole ribosome in complex with its tRNA and mRNA ligands. Since 2013, he has  used Cryogenic electron microscopy to work primarily on eukaryotic and mitochondrial translation. Ramakrishnan is also known for his past work on histone and chromatin structure.

 his most cited papers (according to Google Scholar) have been published in Nature, Science, and Cell.

Ramakrishnan's term as president of the Royal Society was dominated by Brexit and, in his final year, the COVID-19 pandemic and its response. In an interview in July 2018, he said that Britain's decision to leave the European Union was hurting Britain's reputation as a good place to work in science, commenting "It's very hard for the science community to see any advantages in Brexit. They are pretty blunt about that." He saw advantages to both the UK and the EU for Britain to continue to be engaged in Galileo and Euratom, which, unlike the European Medicines Agency, are not EU agencies.

Ramakrishnan argued that a no-deal Brexit would harm science. Ramakrishnan wrote, "A deal on science is in the best interests of Europe as a whole and should not be sacrificed as collateral damage over disagreements on other issues. If we are going to successfully tackle global problems like climate change, human disease and food security, we can't do so in isolation. There is no scenario where trashing our relationships with our closest scientific collaborators in the EU gets us closer to these goals."

Awards and honours

Ramakrishnan was elected a Member of the European Molecular Biology Organization (EMBO) in 2002, a Fellow of the Royal Society (FRS) in 2003, and a Member of the U.S. National Academy of Sciences in 2004. 

In 2007, Ramakrishnan was awarded the Louis-Jeantet Prize for Medicine and the Datta Lectureship and Medal of the Federation of European Biochemical Societies (FEBS). 

In 2008, he won the Heatley Medal of the British Biochemical Society. Since 2008, he is a Fellow of Trinity College, Cambridge and a foreign Fellow of the Indian National Science Academy. In 2010, he became a member of the German Academy of Sciences Leopoldina. He was elected an Honorary Fellow of the Academy of Medical Sciences in 2010, and has received honorary degrees from the Maharaja Sayajirao University of Baroda, University of Utah and University of Cambridge. He is also an Honorary Fellow of Somerville College, Oxford. and The Queen's College, Oxford.

In 2020, he was elected to the American Philosophical Society. 
Also in 2020, he became a board member of The British Library.

In 2009, Ramakrishnan was awarded the Nobel Prize in Chemistry along with Thomas A. Steitz and Ada Yonath. He received India's second highest civilian honor, the Padma Vibhushan, in 2010. 

Ramakrishnan was knighted in the 2012 New Year Honours for services to Molecular Biology, but does not generally use the title "Sir". That same year, he was awarded the Sir Hans Krebs Medal by the FEBS. In 2014, he was awarded the XLVI Jiménez-Díaz Prize by the Fundación Conchita Rábago (Spain). 

In 2017, Ramakrishnan received the Golden Plate Award of the American Academy of Achievement. 

Ramakrishnan was included as one of 25 Greatest Global Living Indians by NDTV Channel, India on 14 December 2013. His certificate of election to the Royal Society reads:

He was made a member of the Order of Merit in 2022.

While he prefers not to use titles and post-nominals, Ramakrishnan is entitled to use the title of "Sir" and OM and FRS in Commonwealth countries.

Personal life
Ramakrishnan married Vera Rosenberry, an author and illustrator of children's books, in 1975. His stepdaughter, Tanya Kapka, is a doctor in Oregon, and his son, Raman Ramakrishnan, is a cellist based in New York.

References

External links 
  including the Nobel Lecture on 8 December 2009 Unraveling the Structure of the Ribosome

1952 births
American biochemists
American biophysicists
American Nobel laureates
British biochemists
British Nobel laureates
British people of Indian Tamil descent
Brookhaven National Laboratory Nobel laureates
British biophysicists
Presidents of the Royal Society
Fellows of Trinity College, Cambridge
American emigrants to England
Indian emigrants to the United States
Knights Bachelor
Living people
Maharaja Sayajirao University of Baroda alumni
Members of the European Molecular Biology Organization
Members of the Order of Merit
Members of the United States National Academy of Sciences
Foreign Fellows of the Indian National Science Academy
Fellows of the Royal Society
Naturalised citizens of the United Kingdom
Nobel laureates in Chemistry
Ohio University alumni
Recipients of the Padma Vibhushan in science & engineering
University of Utah faculty
American academics of Indian descent
Scientists from Tamil Nadu
Indian Nobel laureates
American people of Indian Tamil descent
Tamil scientists
Fellows of Somerville College, Oxford
People with acquired American citizenship
People from Cuddalore district
Members of the American Philosophical Society
Members of the German Academy of Sciences Leopoldina